Raymond Poisson (1630–1690) was a French actor and playwright. Mainly a comic actor, he used the stage names Crispin in comedy and Belleroche in tragedy.

Career
Poisson joined the company of the Hôtel de Bourgogne in Paris, primarily as a comic rival to Molière, who played at the Palais-Royal. As a comedian Poisson wore a black servant costume in a Spanish style and was noted for his stutter. He appropriated the character of Crispin from Scarron's L'Écolier de Salamanque (1654), playing it himself, and wrote and appeared in Lubin (1660) and Le Baron de la Crasse (1661).

He became a founding member of the Comédie-Française in 1680. His son Paul and his grandsons Philippe and Francois-Arnoul all became actors, whilst his granddaughter Madeleine-Angélique de Gomez became a writer.

Notes

Bibliography
 Curtis, A. Ross (1972). Crispin Ier : la vie et l'œuvre de Raymond Poisson, comédien-poète du XVIIe siècle. University of Toronto Romance Series (in French). Toronto: University of Toronto Press. .  – via the Internet Archive.
 Gaines, James F., editor (2002). The Molière Encyclopedia. Westport, Connecticut: Greenwood Press. .
 Hartnoll, Phyllis, editor (1983). The Oxford Companion to the Theatre (fourth edition). Oxford: Oxford University Press. .

17th-century French male actors
French male stage actors
17th-century French dramatists and playwrights
17th-century French male writers
Sociétaires of the Comédie-Française
Writers from Paris
1630 births
1690 deaths